Robert Schulz may refer to:
 Robert Schulz (musician) (born 1938), American jazz musician
 Robert Schulz (astronomer) (born 1972), Austrian amateur astronomer
 Robert L. Schulz, American political activist
 Bob Schulz (fashion designer) (1923–2008), Australian fashion designer

See also 
 Asteroid 410475 Robertschulz, named after the astronomer
 Robert Schultz (disambiguation)